Little Island is a granite island, with an area of 3 ha, in south-eastern Australia.  It is part of Tasmania’s Sentinel Island Group, lying in eastern Bass Strait off the north-west coast of Flinders Island in the Furneaux Group.

Fauna
Seabirds and waders recorded as breeding on the island include little penguin, short-tailed shearwater, white-faced storm-petrel, Pacific gull, Caspian tern and sooty oystercatcher.

References

Furneaux Group